Sinocyclocheilus yimenensis (common name: Yimen golden-line barbel) is a species of cave fish in the family Cyprinidae. It is endemic to Yunnan province in southern China. Its specific name yimenensis refers to the Yimen County where its type locality is.

Description
It grows to  standard length and has a scaled, elongated body. The colouration is golden with a darker back and with some dark
speckles.

Habitat
The type locality is an exit of a subterranean stream.

References 

Cave fish
yimenensis
Freshwater fish of China
Endemic fauna of Yunnan